This list contains all of the summits and subsidiary tops of  or more above sea level in Iran.

Since there is no precise or formal definition of a mountain summit, the number of 4000-metre summits or four-thousanders is arbitrary. Topographic prominence is an important factor in deciding the official nomination of a summit. The list here is based not only on prominence but also on other criteria, such as morphology (general appearance) and mountaineering interest. A minimum prominence criterion of 500 metres would considerably reduce the number of four-thousanders.

List
The table shows the four-thousanders in Iran. There are several summits in the list with multiple peaks, where only the highest is listed.

Clicking the symbol at the head of the column sorts the table by that column's data.

See also

 Iranian plateau
 List of Ultras of West Asia
 Four-thousanders

References

Bibliography
 Ali Moghim, Mountaineering in Iran, Rozaneh, 3rd edition, 2006,  (in Persian: کوهنوردی در ایران)

04
Iranian
Iranian four-thousanders
Iranian four-thousanders